Steven Leroy Griffin (born December 24, 1964) is a former American football wide receiver who played one season with the Atlanta Falcons of the National Football League. He was drafted by the Atlanta Falcons in the twelfth round of the 1986 NFL Draft. Griffin played college football at Purdue University and attended Miami Norland High School in Miami Gardens, Florida. He was also a member of the Washington Commandos, Detroit Drive and Columbus Thunderbolts of the Arena Football League. He was the MVP of ArenaBowl II after accumulating six receptions, two passed deflected and two interceptions in the game.

References

External links
Just Sports Stats
College stats

Living people
1964 births
Players of American football from Miami
American football wide receivers
Miami Norland Senior High School alumni
Purdue Boilermakers football players
Washington Commandos players
Atlanta Falcons players
Detroit Drive players
Cleveland Thunderbolts players